IFK Skövde FK is a Swedish football club located in Skövde in Västra Götaland County.

Background
Since their foundation IFK Skövde FK has participated mainly in the middle and lower divisions of the Swedish football league system.  The club currently plays in Division 3 Mellersta Götaland which is the fifth tier of Swedish football. They play their home matches at the Södermalms IP in Skövde.

IFK Skövde FK are affiliated to Västergötlands Fotbollförbund.

Recent history
In recent seasons IFK Skövde FK have competed in the following divisions:

2011 – Division III, Mellersta Götaland
2010 – Division IV, Västergötland Norra
2009 – Division IV, Västergötland Norra
2008 – Division IV, Västergötland Norra
2007 – Division IV, Västergötland Norra
2006 – Division IV, Västergötland Norra
2005 – Division IV, Västergötland Norra
2004 – Division IV, Västergötland Norra
2003 – Division IV, Västergötland Norra
2002 – Division III, Mellersta Götaland
2001 – Division III, Mellersta Götaland
2000 – Division IV, Västergötland Norra
1999 – Division IV, Västergötland Norra
1998 – Division IV, Västergötland Norra
1997 – Division III, Mellersta Götaland
1996 – Division III, Mellersta Götaland
1995 – Division III, Mellersta Götaland
1994 – Division III, Mellersta Götaland
1993 – Division III, Mellersta Götaland

Attendances

In recent seasons IFK Skövde FK have had the following average attendances:

Footnotes

External links
 IFK Skövde FK – Official website

Football clubs in Västra Götaland County